The Codex Aureus of Lorsch or Lorsch Gospels (Biblioteca Apostolica Vaticana, Pal. lat. 50, and Alba Iulia, Biblioteca Documenta Batthyaneum, s.n.) is an illuminated Gospel Book written in Latin between 778 and 820, roughly coinciding with the period of Charlemagne's rule over the Frankish Empire.  Both the manuscript and the carved ivory panels from the cover are rare and important survivals from the art of this period.

The current location of the various original parts is: 
Batthyaneum Library, Alba Iulia, Romania: Gospels of Matthew and Mark, and canon tables and preliminary matter
Vatican Library: Gospels of Luke and John, and the ivory panels from the rear cover  
Victoria and Albert Museum, London: the ivory panels from the front cover (Inv.-Nr. 138–1866)

History
It was first recorded in Lorsch Abbey (Germany), for which it was presumably written, and where it was mentioned as Evangelium scriptum cum auro pictum habens tabulas eburneas in the catalogue of the Abbey's library, compiled in 830 under Abbot Adelung.  Considering gold letters in the manuscript and its location at Lorsch, it was named the Codex Aureus Laurensius. In the tenth and eleventh centuries, the library of Lorsch was one of the best libraries of the world. 
 
In the 16th century the manuscript was taken to Heidelberg (Otto Heinrich removed the contents of the library to Heidelberg, creating the famous Bibliotheca Palatina, just prior to Lorsch's dissolution in 1563), from whence it was stolen in 1622 during the Thirty Years' War; in order to be easy to sell, the codex was broken in two and the covers torn off.  The richly illustrated first half reached the Migazzi Library and after that was sold to Bishop Ignác Batthyány (1741 – 1798). This section is now in Alba Iulia, Romania, and belongs to the Batthyaneum Library founded by the bishop. The second half is in the Vatican Library.  The back cover, with famous ivory reliefs in a classicising style of Christ treading on the beasts and archangels, is in the Vatican Museums, and the front cover, with the Virgin and Child with saints, angels and a Nativity of Christ below, is in the Victoria and Albert Museum in London.

A facsimile of the codex was presented as a gift to Queen Elizabeth II by Pope Benedict XVI on 16 September 2010, who in turn received a series of Hans Holbein prints from the royal collection.  A full digital version of the manuscript is available online from a number of sources.

Notes

References
Walther, Ingo F. and Norbert Wolf. Codices Illustres: The world's most famous illuminated manuscripts, 400 to 1600. Köln, TASCHEN, 2005.

Gallery

External links

 Codex Aureus of Lorsch on-line  by the library in Alba Iulia
Lorsch Gospels - digital facsimile (Bibliotheca Laureshamensis - digital)
German description
1 (fol 13-14)
2 (matthieu)
3 (fol 72v)
4 (ivoire - christ)
5 (reliure ivoire Marie détail)
6 (reliure ivoire Marie)

Aureus of Lorsch
9th-century biblical manuscripts
Manuscripts of the Vatican Library
Carolingian illuminated manuscripts
Ivory works of art